Mohammad Sattarifar (born 1952) is an Iranian economist, former Vice president of Iran, former head of the Iranian Social Security Organization and the Planning and Management Organization of Iran.

His views and beliefs have helped shape macro-level economic and development policies.

Notes

See also
 Economy of Iran
 Intellectual movements in Iran

Iranian economists
Vice presidents of Iran
Living people
1952 births
Islamic Iran Participation Front politicians
Members of the National Council for Peace